The list of Ontario by-elections includes every by-election held in the Canadian province of Ontario. By-elections occur whenever there is a vacancy in the Legislative Assembly, although an imminent general election may allow the vacancy to remain until the dissolution of parliament.

Causes
A by-election occurs whenever there is a vacancy in the Ontario legislature. Vacancies can occur for the following reasons:

 Death of a member.
 Resignation of a member.
 Voided results
 Expulsion from the legislature.
 Ineligibility to sit.

When there is a vacancy, a by-election must be called within six months. Under amendments to the Election Act approved in 2016, a by-election is no longer required when a vacancy occurs in the 12 months leading up to a fixed general election date.

Ministerial by-elections
The list includes ministerial by-elections which occurred due to the requirement that incumbent members recontest their seats upon being appointed to Cabinet. These by-elections were almost always uncontested. This requirement was amended in 1926 to exempt ministers appointed within three months after a general election. In 1941 it was abolished 
completely.

43rd Legislative Assembly of Ontario 2022–present

42nd Legislative Assembly of Ontario 2018–2022

41st Legislative Assembly of Ontario 2014–2018

40th Legislative Assembly of Ontario 2011–2014

39th Legislative Assembly of Ontario 2007–2011

38th Legislative Assembly of Ontario 2003–2007

37th Legislative Assembly of Ontario 1999–2003

36th Legislative Assembly of Ontario 1995–1999

35th Legislative Assembly of Ontario 1990–1995

34th Legislative Assembly of Ontario 1987–1990

33rd Legislative Assembly of Ontario 1985–1987

32nd Legislative Assembly of Ontario 1981–1985

31st Legislative Assembly of Ontario 1977–1981

30th Legislative Assembly of Ontario 1975–1977
no by-elections

29th Legislative Assembly of Ontario 1971–1975

28th Legislative Assembly of Ontario 1967–1971

27th Legislative Assembly of Ontario 1963–1967

26th Legislative Assembly of Ontario 1959–1963

25th Legislative Assembly of Ontario 1955–1959

† Won by acclamation

24th Legislative Assembly of Ontario 1951–1955

23rd Legislative Assembly of Ontario 1948–1951

22nd Legislative Assembly of Ontario 1945–1948

21st Legislative Assembly of Ontario 1943–1945

20th Legislative Assembly of Ontario 1937–1943

† Won by acclamation

*Though nominally an "Independent-Liberal", MacBride was a supporter of the Liberal government and was a cabinet minister at the time of his death

19th Legislative Assembly of Ontario 1934–1937

† Won by acclamation

18th Legislative Assembly of Ontario 1929–1934

† Won by acclamation

17th Legislative Assembly of Ontario 1926–1929

† Won by acclamation

16th Legislative Assembly of Ontario 1923–1926

† Won by acclamation

15th Legislative Assembly of Ontario 1919–1923

† Won by acclamation

14th Legislative Assembly of Ontario 1914–1919

† Won by acclamation

13th Legislative Assembly of Ontario 1911–1914

† Won by acclamation

12th Legislative Assembly of Ontario 1908–1911

† Won by acclamation

11th Legislative Assembly of Ontario 1905–1908

† Won by acclamation

10th Legislative Assembly of Ontario 1902–1904

9th Legislative Assembly of Ontario 1898–1902

† Won by acclamation

8th Legislative Assembly of Ontario 1894–1898

† Won by acclamation

7th Legislative Assembly of Ontario 1890–1894

† Won by acclamation

6th Legislative Assembly of Ontario 1886–1890

† Won by acclamation

5th Legislative Assembly of Ontario 1883–1886

† Won by acclamation

4th Legislative Assembly of Ontario 1879–1883

† Won by acclamation

*McAllister was a supporter of Mowat's government

3rd Legislative Assembly of Ontario 1875–1879

† Won by acclamation

2nd Legislative Assembly of Ontario 1871–1874

† Won by acclamation

1st Legislative Assembly of Ontario 1867–1871

See also
 List of federal by-elections in Canada

References

Notes

Citations

Further reading
Forman, Debra Legislators and Legislatures of Ontario: A Reference Guide. Legislative Library of Ontario Research and Information Services, 1984
Lewis, Roderick, Centennial Edition of a History of the Electoral Districts, Legislatures and Ministries of the Province of Ontario 1867–1968. F. Fogg, Queen's Printer, 1969.
Electoral history of Ontario: Candidates and Results. Office of the Chief Election Officer of Ontario, 1983

By-elections
Provincial by-elections in Ontario
Elections, by-elections
Ontario, by-ele